Hydroxypyruvic acid is the organic compound with the formula HOCH2C(O)CO2H.  It is a white solid.  It is encountered in many biochemical contexts, being the oxidized derivative of lactic acid, a degradation product of RuBisCO, and the result of oxidative deamination of serine.

See also
 Hydroxypyruvate reductase
 Hydroxypyruvate isomerase
 Hydroxypyruvate decarboxylase

Notes 

Beta hydroxy acids
Alpha-keto acids
Alpha-hydroxy ketones